Železnička Kolonija is an urban neighborhood of Belgrade, the capital of Serbia. It is located in Belgrade's municipality of Zemun.

Location 
Železnička Kolonija is located in the southwestern section of the urban Zemun, on the Belgrade-Novi Sad railroad. It borders the neighborhood of Novi Grad on the north and Kolonija Zmaj on the south while in the east it extends into the neighborhood of Kalvarija.

Characteristics 
The neighborhood was built in 1929 near the Zemun-Novi Grad railway station, thus the name Železnička Kolonija (railway settlement). The original core of the neighborhood consists of 28 residential houses which were initially considered to be temporary so the basic infrastructure (sewage, etc.) was not conducted but the idea was later dropped so the neighborhood survived. 

The later addition to the neighborhood (with unsuccessfully attempted name of Franjine Rudine) in the north and northeast which makes the urban connection to the rest of Zemun is sometimes also considered both part of Novi Grad or Železnička Kolonija. The local community (mesna zajednica, municipal sub-administrative division) which covers this area had a population of 5,557 by the 2002 census of population. A small park within the neighborhood was built in 2007.

Neighborhoods of Belgrade